The Skuppah Indian Band is a First Nations band government located near Spuzzum, British Columbia.  It is a member of the Fraser Canyon Indian Administration, one of three tribal councils of the Nlaka'pamux people.  Other members of the Fraser Canyon Indian Administration are the Spuzzum, Kanaka Bar and Nicomen First Nations (the Nicomen First Nation is also a member of the Nicola Tribal Association).
.  
Other Nlaka'pamux governments belong either to the Nicola Tribal Association or the Nlaka'pamux Nation Tribal Council.

See also
Thompson language

References
Indian and Northern Affairs Canada - First Nation Detail

Nlaka'pamux governments
First Nations governments in the Fraser Canyon